Omphalea is a plant genus of the family Euphorbiaceae first described as a genus in 1759. It is native to tropical parts of the Americas, the West Indies, Asia, Australia, and Africa (including Madagascar).

Omphalea has monoecious, apetalous flowers and fleshy fruits with hard centers.

Ecology
The plants are toxic and few animals can eat them. Diurnal moths of the subfamily Uraniinae feed on them. These moths are species of the genus Urania in the Americas, and of the genus Chrysiridia in Africa.

The only species from mainland Africa is from Tanzania is O. mansfeldiana, a liana from Tanzania . The Madagascan species are O. ankaranensis, a shrub from the limestone karst of northern Madagascar, O. palmata Leandri, a dry forest shrub closely related to O. ankaranensis but from western Madagascar, O. occidentalis Leandri, also a dry forest species of western Madagascar, and O. oppositifilia (Willdenow), a tree from the east coast rainforest of Madagascar.

The Madagascan sunset moth (Chrysiridia rhipheus) feeds on all four of these species.

Species

formerly included
moved to other genera (Mabea Phyllanthus Sapium Sebastiania Senefeldera )

References 

 
Euphorbiaceae genera
Taxa named by Carl Linnaeus